Nito was a trading post of the Maya civilization in Mesoamerica. The site was located at the mouth of the  Dulce River, where the river empties into the Gulf of Honduras. The modern Guatemala city of San Gil de Buena Vista in Izabal Department now occupies the area.

The Maya created a network of trading posts. Some posts were connected by water. The Maya built long canoes to navigate the Campeche Bank, the Yucatan Straits, and the Gulf of Honduras. By means of the various rivers along those shores, they traveled up the rivers toward the Maya cities in the highlands of southern Mexico and Guatemala. Connections were also made to the Aztec traders at Xicalango in Mexico and to the island of Cozumel.  

Some posts were connected by land. Goods were carried, usually by slaves, along paths to a port like Nito, then transferred to canoes to take advantage of the quicker water route. This network therefore provided commerce between the Maya in Mexico, Belize, Guatemala, and Honduras.

Hernán Cortés arrived in 1525 at Nito after his expedition by land through the Yucatan and left by ship on his way back to Mexico.

See also
Manche Ch'ol

Sources 

Maya sites in Guatemala